Sphingobium species are different from other sphingomonads in that they are commonly isolated from soil; however, Sphingobium yanoikuyae was isolated from a clinical specimen. They can degrade a variety of chemicals in the environment such as aromatic and chloroaromatic compounds, phenols like nonylphenol and pentachlorophenol, herbicides such as (RS)-2-(4-chloro-2-methylphenoxy) propionic acid and hexachlorocyclohexane, and polycyclic aromatic hydrocarbons.

References 

Sphingomonadales
Bacteria genera